The Big Boss is a 1941 American drama film directed by Charles Barton and starring Otto Kruger.

Plot

Cast
Otto Kruger as Jim Maloney
Gloria Dickson as Sue Peters
John Litel as Bob Dugan
Don Beddoe as Cliff Randal
Robert Fiske as George Fellows
George Lessey as Williams
Joe Conti as Tony

References

External links

1941 films
Films directed by Charles Barton